Mark Knowles and Daniel Nestor were the defending champions, but did not participate this year.

Leander Paes and Nenad Zimonjić won in the final 6–3, 6–3, against Feliciano López and Rafael Nadal.

Seeds
All seeds receive a bye into the second round.

Draw

Finals

Top half

Bottom half

External links
Draw

Torneo Godo
2005 Torneo Godó